The Consultation on Common Texts (CCT) is "an ecumenical consultation of liturgical scholars and denominational representatives from the United States and Canada, who produce liturgical texts for use in common by North American Christian Churches." Its most significant product is the Revised Common Lectionary (RCL).

See also
English Language Liturgical Consultation

References

External links
 The CCT web site

Christian organizations based in North America
Practical theology